Model 1 may refer to:

 Austin Model 1, a semi-empirical method for the quantum calculation of molecular electronic structure in computational chemistry
 Boeing Model 1, a United States single-engine biplane seaplane aircraft
 Breese-Dallas Model 1, a prototype single engine airliner that rapidly changed hands throughout the 1930s
 Fleet Model 1, a biplane from 1928
 JSP model 1 architecture, a design pattern used in the design of Java Web applications
 Sega Model 1, an arcade system board released by Sega in 1992
 Smith & Wesson Model 1, an American revolver produced from 1876 through 1911

See also
M1 (disambiguation)